Qaleh Hasan (also Romanized as Qal‘eh Ḩasan and Qal‘eh-ye Ḩasan; also known as Ḩasan Qal‘eh and Ḩasan) is a village in Sivkanlu Rural District, in the Central District of Shirvan County, North Khorasan Province, Iran. At the 2006 census, its population was 423, in 100 families.

References 

Populated places in Shirvan County